These are the official results of the Men's Discus Throw event at the 2001 World Championships in Edmonton, Alberta, Canada. There were a total number of 26 participating athletes, with the final held on Wednesday 8 August 2001. The qualification mark was set at 65.50 metres.

Medalists

Schedule
All times are Mountain Standard Time (UTC-7)

Abbreviations
All results shown are in metres

Records

Startlist

Qualification

Group A

Group B

Final

See also
2002 European Championships

References
 Results
 IAAF

D
Discus throw at the World Athletics Championships